Augyles ivojenisi, is a species of variegated mud-loving beetle found in India, Nepal, Myanmar and Sri Lanka.

References 

Byrrhoidea
Insects of Sri Lanka
Insects described in 1995